Toronto Montessori Schools, now rebranded to "TMS School", is one of the oldest Montessori schools in Canada. Founded by Helma Trass in 1961, it still remains the most well-known Montessori school in Ontario. The school moved to Richmond Hill from Toronto in 1964. The school's Bayview Campus (18 months to Grade 6 students) and the Elgin Mills Campus (Grades 7 to 12) are located in Richmond Hill, Ontario, Canada.  The Head of School is currently Mr. Andrew Cross. The school's first location was in Toronto,  which is why, despite being located now in Richmond Hill, it maintained its name 'Toronto Montessori Schools'.

Toronto Montessori Institute opened in 1971 at Victoria College, University of Toronto and relocated to Richmond Hill in 1980.

The TMS School Bayview Campus is located at 8569 Bayview Avenue and is one of the flagship Montessori schools for students aged 18 months to Grade 6.  The TMS School Elgin Mills Campus, which opened its doors in September 2009, is an International Baccalaureate (IB) facility for students in TMS Upper School (Grades 7 to 12) – an IB World School with both the IB Middle Years Programme and the IB Diploma Programme. Also located at the Bayview Campus address is the Toronto Montessori Institute (TMI), founded in 1971 and one of the oldest teacher training Montessori schools in Canada.

TMS School remains a flagship Montessori school (18 months to Grade 6) and IB world school (Grades 7 to 12) and has been internationally recognized since 1961.

Clubs and teams
At the Bayview Campus there are a large variety of clubs and sports teams including Friends of the Community, the Upper Elementary play, and the Lower Elementary choirs. Both the Bayview and Elgin Mills Campus offers a variety of extracurricular activities such as Students for Social Justice to JAM (a cover band). College students are required to take part in at least one sport, one arts club/program, and  complete a minimum amount of community service hours.
TMS School is of the SSAF (Small Schools Athletic Federation). Competitive sports at TMS include:
 Basketball
 Volleyball
 Track and field
 Field hockey
 Curling
 Outdoor soccer
 Indoor soccer
 Badminton
 Cross-country
 Golf
 Flag football
 Running Club

Houses
In Grade 7, when students enter the upper school at TMS School, they are assigned to one of four Houses. The mission of the House System is to unify students into proud families that will be challenged and entertained, fostering the spirit of the student body.  The four Houses are named after mythological titans, echoing the school theme of Titans:
 Atlas
 Helios
 Phoebe
 Tethys

Students take part in activities with their Houses that are designed to promote friendly competition amongst the Houses involving all branches of the four pillars (academics, arts, athletics, and citizenship) including general spirit.  House points are recorded throughout the year and the House with the greatest total is awarded the House Cup at the end of the year.

Each House has two elected House Captains.

References

External links
TMS School - Official Website - Home
HOME :: TMI

Elementary schools in Toronto
High schools in Toronto
International Baccalaureate schools in Ontario
Montessori schools in Canada
Educational institutions established in 1961
1961 establishments in Ontario